The Halman Horizon, also referred to as the Halman 27, is a Canadian sailboat that was designed by Michael Volmer as a cruiser and first built in 1982.

Production
The design was built by Halman Manufacturing in Beamsville, Ontario, Canada, but it is now out of production. A total of 42 examples were completed, with production commencing in 1982.

The designer, Michael Volmer, was also CEO of the company.

Design

The Horizon is a recreational keelboat, built predominantly of fibreglass, with wood trim. The majority were built with a masthead sloop rig, although some were built with a cutter rig. It features a spooned raked stem, a very rounded and bulbous transom, a skeg-mounted rudder, with a portion protruding around the transom, controlled by a wheel and a fixed fin keel. It displaces  and carries  of ballast.

See also
List of sailing boat types

Related development
Halman 20

Similar sailboats
Aloha 27
C&C 27
Cal 27
Cal 2-27
Cal 3-27
Catalina 27
Catalina 270
Catalina 275 Sport
Crown 28
CS 27
Edel 820
Express 27
Fantasia 27
Hotfoot 27
Hullmaster 27
Hunter 27
Hunter 27-2
Hunter 27-3
Irwin 27 
Island Packet 27
Mirage 27 (Perry)
Mirage 27 (Schmidt)
O'Day 272
Orion 27-2
Tanzer 27
Watkins 27
Watkins 27P

References

External links

Keelboats
1980s sailboat type designs
Sailing yachts
Sailboat type designs by Michael Volmer
Sailboat types built by Halman Manufacturing